Brachistosternus is a scorpion genus in the Bothriuridae family. B. ehrenbergii is the most cited species in the genus. The genus is distributed in Argentina, Bolivia, Brazil, Chile, Colombia, Ecuador, Paraguay, and Peru.

Species 
Brachistosternus contains the following fifty species:

 Brachistosternus aconcagua Ojanguren Affilastro & Luisa-Scioscia, 2007
 Brachistosternus alienus Lönnberg, 1898
 Brachistosternus anandrovestigia Ojanguren Affilastro, Pizarro-Araya & Ochoa, 2018
 Brachistosternus andinus Chamberlin, 1916
 Brachistosternus angustimanus Ojanguren Affilastro & Roig Alsina, 2001
 Brachistosternus artigasi Cekalovic, 1974
 Brachistosternus barrigai Ojanguren Affilastro & Pizarro-Araya, 2014
 Brachistosternus castroi Mello-Leitao, 1940 (nomen dubium)
 Brachistosternus cekalovici Ojanguren Affilastro, 2005
 Brachistosternus cepedai Ojanguren Affilastro, Augusto, Pizarro-Araya & Mattoni, 2007
 Brachistosternus chango Ojanguren Affilastro, Mattoni & Prendini, 2007
 Brachistosternus chilensis Kraepelin, 1911
 Brachistosternus chimba Ojanguren Affilastro, Alfaro & Pizarro-Araya, 2021
 Brachistosternus contisuyu Ojanguren Affilastro, Pizarro-Araya & Ochoa, 2018
 Brachistosternus coquimbo Ojanguren Affilastro, Augusto, Pizarro-Araya & Mattoni, 2007
 Brachistosternus donosoi Cekalovic, 1974
 Brachistosternus ehrenbergii (Gervais, 1841)
 Brachistosternus ferrugineus (Thorell, 1876)
 Brachistosternus gayi Ojanguren Affilastro, Pizarro-Araya & Ochoa, 2018
 Brachistosternus galianoae Ojanguren Affilastro, 2002
 Brachistosternus holmbergi Carbonell, 1923 (nomen dubium)
 Brachistosternus intermedius Lönnberg, 1902
 Brachistosternus kamanchaca Ojanguren Affilastro, Mattoni & Prendini, 2007
 Brachistosternus kovariki Ojanguren Affilastro, 2003
 Brachistosternus llullaillaco Ojanguren Affilastro, Alfaro & Pizarro-Araya, 2021
 Brachistosternus mattonii Ojanguren Affilastro, 2005
 Brachistosternus misti Ojanguren Affilastro, Pizarro-Araya & Ochoa, 2018
 Brachistosternus montanus Roig Alsina, 1977
 Brachistosternus multidentatus Maury, 1984
 Brachistosternus negrei Cekalovic, 1975
 Brachistosternus ninapo Ochoa, 2004
 Brachistosternus ochoai Ojanguren Affilastro, 2004
 Brachistosternus paposo Ojanguren Affilastro & Pizarro-Araya, 2014
 Brachistosternus paulae Ojanguren Affilastro, 2003
 Brachistosternus pegnai Cekalovic, 1969
 Brachistosternus pentheri Mello-Leitao, 1931
 Brachistosternus perettii Ojanguren Affilastro & Mattoni, 2006
 Brachistosternus peruvianus Toledo Piza, 1974
 Brachistosternus philippii Ojanguren Affilastro, Pizarro-Araya & Ochoa, 2018
 Brachistosternus piacentinii Ojanguren Affilastro, 2003
 Brachistosternus prendinii Ojanguren Affilastro, 2003
 Brachistosternus quiscapata Ochoa & Acosta, 2002
 Brachistosternus roigalsinai Ojanguren Affilastro, 2002
 Brachistosternus sciosciae Ojanguren Affilastro, 2002
 Brachistosternus simoneae Lourenço, 2000 (nomen dubium)
 Brachistosternus telteca Ojanguren Affilastro, 2000
 Brachistosternus titicaca Ochoa & Acosta, 2002
 Brachistosternus turpuq Ochoa, 2002
 Brachistosternus weyenberghi (Thorell, 1876)
 Brachistosternus zambrunoi Ojanguren Affilastro, 2002

References 

Bothriuridae
Scorpion genera
Scorpions of South America